Winterlude is an annual winter festival held in Ottawa, Ontario and Gatineau, Quebec (collectively known as the National Capital Region).

Winterlude is run by the Department of Canadian Heritage and was started in 1979. The event is one of Ottawa's most important tourist draws, attracting hundreds of thousands of visitors each year. In 2007, it set a new attendance record of an estimated 1.6 million visits to one of the four Winterlude sites. BizBash has recognized Winterlude as one of the top 100 annual attractions in Canada and the United States

Activities

Attractions
The focal point of Winterlude is the Rideau Canal Skateway which at 7.8 kilometres (approximately 5 miles) is the largest skating rink in the world.

Another primary site is Snowflake Kingdom, which is located in Jacques-Cartier Park in Gatineau. This site is turned into a massive "snow park" with ice slides and snow sculptures and also hosts numerous events and activities for children.

Confederation Park, better known as Crystal Garden, is the site for the ice sculpture competition, the ice lounge and musical concerts. Marion Dewar Plaza at City Hall (across from Confederation Park) is the site of the Rink of Dreams, an ice-skating rink that hosts skating shows, DJ dance parties and interactive art displays throughout the Festival. Dow's Lake also has a large skating area and hosts various activities.

Related activities include special exhibits at numerous Ottawa museums, special events in the Byward Market, Sparks Street, and a variety of other events throughout the city.

A group of fictional groundhog-like creatures called "Ice Hogs" serve as the mascots for the festival.

Corridas 
Several racing events are held in conjunction with Winterlude. The Gatineau Loppet, inaugurated in 1979, is an internationally recognized cross-country ski race that takes place in Gatineau Park. The event also holds snowshoe and fat bike races. Since 1984, the Winterlude Triathlon has also been part of the festival. The format and location of the winter triathlon has changed frequently over the years. The race currently consists of a 8km skate across the Rideau Canal, a 5km run along Colonel By Drive, and a 6km ski at Mooney's Bay Park. Other race events include bed racing and "ice dragon boat" racing.

Duration
Winterlude lasts for three weekends, usually the first three weekends in February. Very few events take place from Monday to Thursday in between weekends 1 and 2, and weekends 2 and 3. This means that the skating rink is much less crowded and that the ice stays in a near pristine condition for much of the day, with only a thousand or so skaters sharing it instead of the greater numbers during the weekend. The skate changing shacks and food catering kiosks scattered along the length of the skateway, at the same level as the ice, are open during the week.

The weather in Ottawa is notoriously unpredictable, and Winterlude often is hampered by warm temperatures. Mild weather is the bane of the Canal, as proper ice conditions require -10°C/14°F for proper freezing. The length of the skating season (which often extends past Winterlude) is therefore unpredictable. However, most events are usually not affected other than premature melting of ice and snow sculptures. The average length to which the canal is open for skating is 50 days, but varies greatly. In the 2001—2002 season there was a (then) record low 34 days of skating. The very next season, 2002–2003, the canal was open for a near-record high 72 days. The longest skating season was 1971—1972, lasting 95 days. The shortest was 2015—2016, lasting just 18 days.

Gallery

See also
 Winter festival

References

External links

Festivals in Ottawa
Festivals in Gatineau
Festivals established in 1979
Winter festivals in Canada
National Capital Commission
Winter festivals
1979 establishments in Ontario
1979 establishments in Quebec
Department of Canadian Heritage
Annual events in Ottawa